Macaulay Macaulay Culkin Culkin (born Macaulay Carson Culkin) is an American actor. Often regarded as one of the most successful child actors of the 1990s, he was placed 2nd on VH1's list of the "100 Greatest Kid-Stars". Culkin rose to prominence as a child actor starring as Kevin McCallister in the first two films of the Home Alone film series (1990 and 1992), for which he was nominated for the Golden Globe Award for Best Actor – Motion Picture Musical or Comedy. He also starred in the films My Girl (1991), The Good Son (1993), The Nutcracker (1993), Getting Even with Dad (1994), The Pagemaster (1994), and Richie Rich (1994).

Culkin took a break from acting in 1994. He returned in 2003 with a guest appearance on the television show Will & Grace and a role in the film Party Monster. He wrote an autobiography, Junior, which was published in 2006. In 2021, he starred in American Horror Story: Double Feature, the tenth season of the anthology series American Horror Story.

In 2013, Culkin co-founded the New York comedy rock band the Pizza Underground, of which he was the vocalist; in 2016, Culkin stated that the Pizza Underground was splitting up and their next album would be their last. He is currently the publisher and CEO of Bunny Ears, a satirical pop culture website and podcast.

He has also received an MTV Movie Award from three nominations, and a Young Artist Award.

Early life
Macaulay Carson Culkin was born on August 26, 1980, in New York City to Christopher Cornelius "Kit" Culkin, a former stage actor, and Patricia Brentrup, a native of North Dakota who met Kit in 1974 while working as a road traffic controller in Sundance, Wyoming. The couple soon relocated to Kit's native New York City, and gave birth to a total of seven children: Culkin's siblings include Shane ( 1976), Dakota (1979–2008), Kieran ( 1982), Quinn ( 1984), Christian ( 1987), and Rory ( 1989). He also had a paternal half-sister, Jennifer (born 1970), who died in 2000. His paternal aunt is actress Bonnie Bedelia. Culkin is of part-Irish descent.

During Culkin's early childhood, the family lived together in a small apartment in the Yorkville neighborhood of Manhattan, and struggled financially. His mother worked as a telephone operator and his father was a sacristan at a local Catholic church. Culkin was raised Roman Catholic and attended St. Joseph's School of Yorkville for five years before transferring to the Professional Children's School.

Career

1980s: Career beginnings
Culkin began acting at age four. His early roles included a stage production of Bach Babies at the New York Philharmonic. He continued appearing in roles on stage, television and films throughout the 1980s. He made an appearance in the TV movie The Midnight Hour (1985). In 1988, he appeared in an episode of the popular action television series The Equalizer, in which he played a kidnapping victim, Paul Gephardt.

Culkin made his film debut as Cy Blue Black in the drama Rocket Gibraltar (1988). He played the role of Billy Livingstone in the romantic comedy film See You in the Morning (1989), starring Jeff Bridges, Alice Krige, Farrah Fawcett and Drew Barrymore. He starred as Miles Russell alongside actor John Candy in the comedy film Uncle Buck (1989).

1990s: Breakthrough with Home Alone and mainstream child roles

Culkin rose to fame with his lead role of Kevin McCallister in the blockbuster comedy film Home Alone (1990). The film reunited him with Uncle Buck writer and director John Hughes and Uncle Buck co-star John Candy, who played the role of Polka band member Gus Polinski. For his performance, Culkin was nominated for a Golden Globe Award and won an American Comedy Award and a Young Artist Award. In a 2022 interview with People, co-star Joe Pesci said Culkin was "a really sweet kid and, even at his age, very professional."

In 1991, Culkin starred in an animated Saturday morning cartoon television series titled Wish Kid, hosted Saturday Night Live and starred in Michael Jackson's "Black or White" music video. He starred as Thomas J. Sennett in the film My Girl (1991), for which he was nominated for Best On-Screen Duo, and won Best Kiss at the MTV Movie Awards, with Anna Chlumsky.

Culkin was paid $4.5 million (compared to $110,000 for the original) for Home Alone 2: Lost in New York (1992). He played the role of Henry in the drama thriller film The Good Son (1993), which only did reasonably well, although he was nominated for an MTV Movie Award in the category for Best Villain for his performance. He was also a student at the School of American Ballet and appeared in a filmed version of The Nutcracker as the title role in 1993, which was staged by Peter Martins from the 1954 George Balanchine New York City Ballet version of the work. He was also in the films Getting Even with Dad (1994), The Pagemaster (1994) and Richie Rich (1994), which all performed poorly at the box office.

Culkin grew tired of acting and retired after Richie Rich. Wanting a "normal life", he went to a private high school in Manhattan. In 1998, he appeared in the music video for the song "Sunday" by the rock band Sonic Youth.

2000s: Guest appearances and independent films
In 2000, Culkin returned to acting with a role in the play Madame Melville, which was staged in London's West End. In early 2003, he made a guest appearance on the NBC sitcom Will & Grace. His role as Karen Walker's deceptively immature divorce lawyer won him favorable reviews. Culkin headed back into motion pictures in 2003 with Party Monster, in which he played a role very different from those he was known for, that of party promoter Michael Alig, a drug user and murderer. He quickly followed that with a supporting part in Saved!, as a cynical wheelchair-using, non-Christian student in a conservative Christian high school. Though Saved! only had modest success at the box office, Culkin received positive reviews for his role in the film and its implications for a career as an adult actor. Culkin began doing voice-over work, with appearances in Seth Green's Robot Chicken. In 2006, he published an experimental, semi-autobiographical novel titled Junior, which talked about Culkin's stardom and his shaky relationship with his father.

Culkin starred in Sex and Breakfast, a dark comedy written and directed by Miles Brandman. Alexis Dziena, Kuno Becker and Eliza Dushku also star in this story of a couple whose therapist recommends they engage in group sex. Shooting for the film, Culkin's first since Saved!, took place in September 2006. The film opened in Los Angeles on November 30, 2007, and was released on DVD on January 22, 2008, by First Look Pictures. Culkin's next project was a role in the thirteen-episode NBC television series Kings as Andrew Cross.

In 2009, Culkin appeared in a UK-based commercial for Aviva Insurance (formerly Norwich Union) to help promote their company's rebranding. Culkin stared into the camera stating, "Remember me." On August 17, 2009, Culkin made a brief cameo appearance on WWE Raw at the Scottrade Center in St. Louis, Missouri, following a "falls count anywhere" match between Hornswoggle and Chavo Guerrero Jr., in which Guerrero was defeated by the classic Home Alone gag of rigging a swinging paint can to hit him upon opening a door. Culkin appeared in the doorway and said, "That's not funny." In February 2010, Culkin appeared in an episode of Poppy de Villeneuve's online series for The New York Times, The Park. On March 7 of the same year, he appeared alongside actors Matthew Broderick, Molly Ringwald, Judd Nelson, Ally Sheedy, Anthony Michael Hall, and Jon Cryer in a tribute to the late John Hughes at the Oscars.

2010s: Experimental films, Bunny Ears, and collaborations with Red Letter Media

In April 2011, Culkin was featured in musician Adam Green's experimental film The Wrong Ferarri, which was entirely shot on an iPhone. In the same month, he also appeared in the music video for "Stamp Your Name on It" performed by Green's former bandmate Jack Dishel/Only Son. In September 2012, he appeared in a video on YouTube explaining how he turned his apartment in New York into a painting workshop.

In December 2013, a viral video that Culkin co-produced and directed himself eating a cheese pizza was uploaded to YouTube, co-starring Phoebe Kreutz. He was parodying Andy Warhol consuming a Burger King Whopper in Jørgen Leth's documentary 66 Scenes from America. Culkin was promoting the debut of his New York-based, pizza-themed comedy rock band The Pizza Underground. Their tour began in Brooklyn on January 24, 2014. In late May 2014, Culkin stormed off stage at Rock City during his kazoo solo after fans began booing and throwing pints of beer at the band. They subsequently cancelled the remaining UK shows, though they claimed the cancellation had nothing to do with the Rock City performance. On July 10, 2016, Culkin announced that The Pizza Underground was splitting up and their next album would be the last.

In July 2016, Culkin appeared in a television advertisement for Compare the Market. In January 2018, Culkin launched a comedy website and podcast called Bunny Ears that parodied other celebrity-owned websites such as Gwyneth Paltrow's Goop. Since 2018, Culkin has been a frequent guest of Red Letter Media, appearing in multiple episodes of their Best of the Worst, re:View, and Half in the Bag webseries, as well as Angry Video Game Nerd, where he appears as either himself, a character, or a parody of himself. In an advertisement for Google Assistant published on December 19, 2018, Culkin reprised his Home Alone role as Kevin McCallister after 28 years. It recreated scenes from the movie where McCallister shaved his face, jumped on the bed, and decorated the Christmas tree, all while asking Google Assistant to set reminders for him. The advertisement quickly went viral. In 2019, he had a role in Seth Green's movie Changeland with Brenda Song, which was released on June 7, 2019.

2020s: Resurgence with American Horror Story
In 2021, Culkin was part of the starring cast of the series' tenth season, American Horror Story: Double Feature. His role in the season was critically praised.

Personal life
Culkin said his father, Kit Culkin, was cruel and violent in his childhood. He said he felt his father was jealous, because "everything he tried to do in his life I excelled at before I was 10 years old". Culkin's parents never married; they split when Culkin was in his teens, and his mother filed for custody. Culkin took his parents to court to block them from controlling his trust fund, which was reportedly worth between $15 and 20 million. He has been estranged from his father since. The media reported that Culkin had divorced or emancipated himself from his parents; in 2018, Culkin denied this, saying he had instead removed his parents' name from his trust fund and found an executor.

On May 10, 2000, Culkin's half-sister, Jennifer Adamson, died of a drug overdose. On December 10, 2008, his older sister, Dakota, died after being hit by a car.

After being arraigned in court for misdemeanor drug offenses, he pleaded not guilty at the trial (October 15, 2004 to June 9, 2005), but later reversed the plea to guilty. He received three one-year suspended prison sentences  and was ordered to pay $540 in fees.

In December 2018, Culkin announced that he would legally change his name to "Macaulay Macaulay Culkin Culkin" after holding a vote through his website to choose a new middle name, with "Macaulay Culkin" winning the vote over four other candidates.

In August 2020, on his 40th birthday, Culkin tweeted, "Hey guys, wanna feel old? I'm 40. You're welcome." The tweet became one of the most-liked tweets of all time.

Romantic relationships
Culkin said in a May 27, 2004 interview on Larry King Live that he tends to refrain from disclosing aspects of his personal life, though he discussed his life as a child actor, the conflict in his family life, including his estrangement from his father, and how he retired from acting at age 14. Culkin married actress Rachel Miner in 1998 when they were both 18, but they separated in 2000 and divorced in 2002.

Culkin began dating actress Mila Kunis in May 2002. By 2006, he was living in New York, while Kunis was living in Los Angeles. On January 3, 2011, Kunis's publicist confirmed reports that Culkin and Kunis had ended their relationship several months previously, saying, "The split was amicable, and they remain close friends." Since 2013, Culkin has lived in Paris.

In March 2018, it was reported that Culkin is in a relationship with his Changeland co-star Brenda Song. On April 5, 2021, Song gave birth to the couple's son. Shortly after his son's birth, comments Culkin made on a 2018 episode of The Joe Rogan Experience about his relationship with Song resurfaced, which were criticized for stereotyping Asians. In the interview, Culkin joked about the shape of Song's eyes, their interracial relationship, and the appearance of their potential future children. He argued that he was entitled to make Asian jokes because of his relationship with Song, and because of his future fatherhood to multiracial children, stating that he would "understand the struggle".

Friendship with Michael Jackson

Around the time of the first Home Alone movie, Culkin became friends with the pop singer Michael Jackson and appeared in Jackson's 1991 "Black or White" music video. In 2005, at Jackson's trial for sexual child abuse, Culkin testified that he had slept in bed with Jackson but that he was never molested. Culkin dismissed the allegations against Jackson as "absolutely ridiculous". Culkin attended Jackson's burial on September 3, 2009. Culkin is also the godfather of Jackson's children Paris Jackson, Prince and Michael Jr. Culkin has consistently defended Jackson against allegations of child molestation, and said in a 2020 interview with Esquire: "I never saw anything; he never did anything."

Awards and nominations

Notes

References

Bibliography
 Holmstrom, John. The Moving Picture Boy: An International Encyclopaedia from 1895 to 1995, Norwich, Michael Russell, 1996, p. 398.

External links

 
 

1980 births
Living people
20th-century American male actors
21st-century American male actors
American male ballet dancers
American male child actors
American male film actors
American male stage actors
American male television actors
American male voice actors
American male web series actors
American podcasters
American people of Irish descent
Catholics from New York (state)
Male actors from New York (state)
Male actors from New York City
Musicians from New York City
Theatre World Award winners